The 2022 Sverdlovsk Oblast gubernatorial election took place on 11 September 2022, on common election day. Governor Yevgeny Kuyvashev was re-elected for a third term.

Background
Presidential Envoy to the Ural Federal District Yevgeny Kuyvashev was appointed acting Governor of Sverdlovsk Oblast in May 2012, and later that month he was confirmed in the position by the Legislative Assembly of Sverdlovsk Oblast. Kuyvashev won his second term in 2017 election with 62.16% of the vote.

Since autumn 2021 rumours spread about Kuyvashev potential resignation, however, the governor generally avoided complaints about his job. In April 2022, Kuyvashev publicly feuded with TV host Vladimir Solovyov after the latter's degrading comments about Yekaterinburg. Despite the rumours and the public conflict, on 20 May President Vladimir Putin endorsed Kuyvashev for reelection.

Due to the start of Russian special military operation in Ukraine in February 2022 and subsequent economic sanctions the cancellation and postponement of direct gubernatorial elections was proposed. The measure was even supported by A Just Russia leader Sergey Mironov. Eventually, on 7 June Legislative Assembly of Sverdlovsk Oblast called the gubernatorial election for 11 September 2022.

Candidates
Only political parties can nominate candidates for gubernatorial election in Sverdlovsk Oblast, self-nomination is not possible. However, candidates are not obliged to be members of the nominating party. Candidate for Governor of Sverdlovsk Oblast should be a Russian citizen and at least 30 years old. Each candidate in order to be registered is required to collect at least 7.9% of signatures of members and heads of municipalities (121-127 signatures). Also, gubernatorial candidates present three candidacies to the Federation Council and election winner later appoints one of the presented candidates.

Registered
 Alexander Demin (New People), Member of State Duma, Chairman of the Duma Committee on Small and Medium-sized Entrepreneurship
 Aleksandr Ivachyov (CPRF), Deputy Chairman of Legislative Assembly of Sverdlovsk Oblast
 Aleksandr Kaptyug (LDPR), Member of Legislative Assembly of Sverdlovsk Oblast
 Yevgeny Kuyvashev (United Russia), incumbent Governor of Sverdlovsk Oblast
 Andrey Kuznetsov (SR-ZP), Member of State Duma

Failed to qualify
 Ivan Volkov (ROS), lawyer, 2017 gubernatorial candidate

Eliminated at convention
 Dmitry Zhukov (United Russia), Member of Legislative Assembly of Sverdlovsk Oblast

Declined
 Konstantin Kiselyov (Yabloko), Member of Yekaterinburg City Duma, 2017 The Greens gubernatorial candidate
 Yevgeny Roizman (Yabloko), former Mayor of Yekaterinburg (2013-2018), former Member of State Duma (2003-2007), 2017 gubernatorial candidate
 Igor Toroshchin (LDPR), former Member of State Duma (2016-2021), 2017 gubernatorial candidate

Candidates for Federation Council
Incumbent Senator Eduard Rossel (United Russia) was not renominated.
Aleksandr Demin (New People):
Yaroslav Borodin, TV host, actor
Tatyana Fleganova, Member of Civic Chamber of Sverdlovsk Oblast, nonprofit executive
Aleksey Nevyantsev, entrepreneur

Aleksandr Ivachyov (CPRF):
Yevgeny Bukreyev, Member of Legislative Assembly of Sverdlovsk Oblast, Kirovgrad School №3 director
Taras Isakov, Member of Legislative Assembly of Sverdlovsk Oblast, retired Lieutenant General
Rimma Skomorokhova, Member of Legislative Assembly of Sverdlovsk Oblast

Aleksandr Kaptyug (LDPR):
Vladimir Korolkov, LDPR regional office lawyer
Kristina Rachkevich, deputy coordinator of LDPR regional office
Alyona Vyatkina, economist

Yevgeny Kuyvashev (United Russia):
Irina Levina, co-chair of ONF regional office, Director of Sverdlovsk Oblast Medical College
Aleksey Orlov, Mayor of Yekaterinburg
Viktor Sheptiy, First Deputy Speaker of Legislative Assembly of Sverdlovsk Oblast

Andrey Kuznetsov (SR-ZP):
Oksana Ivanova, aide to Andrey Kuznetsov, Christian activist
Aleksey Korovkin, emergency medical technician
Leonid Martyushev, Member of Nizhny Tagil City Duma

Finances
All sums are in rubles.

Polls

Results

|- style="background-color:#E9E9E9;text-align:center;"
! style="text-align:left;" colspan=2| Candidate
! style="text-align:left;"| Party
! width="75"|Votes
! width="30"|%
|-
| style="background-color:;"|
| style="text-align:left;"| Yevgeny Kuyvashev (incumbent)
| style="text-align:left;"| United Russia
| 618,617
| 65.78
|-
| style="background-color:|
| style="text-align:left;"| Aleksandr Ivachyov
| style="text-align:left;"| Communist Party
| 121,351
| 12.90
|-
| style="background-color:;"|
| style="text-align:left;"| Andrey Kuznetsov
| style="text-align:left;"| A Just Russia — For Truth
| 86,047
| 9.15
|-
| style="background-color:|
| style="text-align:left;"| Alexander Demin
| style="text-align:left;"| New People
| 60,883
| 6.47
|-
| style="background-color:;"|
| style="text-align:left;"| Aleksandr Kaptyug
| style="text-align:left;"| Liberal Democratic Party
| 29,857
| 3.17
|-
| style="text-align:left;" colspan="3"| Valid votes
| 916,755
| 97.49
|-
| style="text-align:left;" colspan="3"| Blank ballots
| 23,648
| 2.51
|- style="font-weight:bold"
| style="text-align:left;" colspan="3"| Total
| 950,405
| 100.00
|-
| style="background-color:#E9E9E9;" colspan="6"|
|-
| style="text-align:left;" colspan="3"| Turnout
| 950,405
| 28.47
|-
| style="text-align:left;" colspan="3"| Registered voters
| 3,303,323
| 100.00
|-
| colspan="5" style="background-color:#E9E9E9;"|
|- style="font-weight:bold"
| colspan="4" |Source:
|
|}

Legislative Assembly of Sverdlovsk Oblast First Vice-Speaker Viktor Sheptiy (United Russia) was appointed to the Federation Council, replacing incumbent Senator Eduard Rossel (United Russia).

See also
2022 Russian gubernatorial elections

References

Sverdlovsk Oblast
Sverdlovsk Oblast
Politics of Sverdlovsk Oblast